Veliko Središte is a village in Serbia. It is situated in the Vršac municipality, in the South Banat District, Vojvodina province.

Demography
The village has a Serb ethnic majority (77.91%) and its population numbering 1,269 people (2011 census). There is a sizable number of ethnic Hungarians (7.38%), Czechs (4.25%), Romanians (2.38%) and other minorities as well as ethnically mixed families which is not uncommon in Vojvodina.

Name
In Serbian, the village is known as Veliko Središte (Велико Средиште), in Hungarian as Nagyszered, in Romanian as Srediștea Mare, and in German as Groß-Sredischte.

Historical population

1961: 2,120
1971: 1,815
1981: 1,698
1991: 1,584
2002: 1,340
2011: 1,269

Gallery

See also
List of places in Serbia
List of cities, towns and villages in Vojvodina

References
Slobodan Ćurčić, Broj stanovnika Vojvodine, Novi Sad, 1996.

Populated places in Serbian Banat
Populated places in South Banat District
Vršac